The Abbey of Saint Pancras of Backnang, better known as Backnang Abbey, was a German monastery of canons regular founded around AD 1100 in Backnang, in the Duchy of Swabia.

History
The abbey was founded before 1116 by Herman I, Margrave of Baden, and his wife, Countess Judith of Backnang-Sulichgau. Pope Paschal I confirmed the foundation in 1116. As early as 1123, though, the monastery had to be revived by their son, Margrave Herman II, with the help of canons from Marbach Abbey in Alsace.

Between 1123 and 1243, the abbey was the burial place of the Zähringen Margraves of Baden, a connection which brought much influence and prosperity.

Backnang's geographical position exposed it, from the 13th century onwards, to attack by the Counts of Württemberg, and for this reason in 1243 Margravine Irmengard transferred the remains of her husband Hermann V of Baden to her foundation of Lichtenthal Abbey in the town of Baden-Baden.

In 1297, possession of Backnang passed to Württemberg. In 1366, Count Eberhard II of Württemberg succeeded in gaining control of the abbey's finances. In 1477, it was changed into a secular collegiate chapter, with the approval of Pope Sixtus IV.

In 1535, as part of the Protestant Reformation, the community was dissolved. The canons of Backnang, however, by making a complaint to Emperor Charles V, obtained permission to reoccupy it, which they did in 1551. The last of them died in 1593, when the house was finally suppressed.

The abbey church (Stiftskirche) still stands in Backnang.

External links 

 Klosterbuch Baden Württemberg über das Stift Backnang

Christian monasteries established in the 12th century
Augustinian monasteries in Germany
Monasteries in Baden-Württemberg
1590s disestablishments in the Holy Roman Empire
Buildings and structures in Rems-Murr-Kreis
Burial sites of the House of Zähringen